Titus Lake may refer to:

 Titus Lake (Idaho), a lake in Idaho
 Titus Lake (New York), a lake in New York